Jason Figgis is an Irish film director.

Early life, family and education

Jason was born in Ranelagh, Dublin and attended St. Mary’s College in Rathmines.

He attended Ballyfermot Senior College in Dublin to study art and was soon working for Murakami-Wolf Animation Studios on the celebrated cult TV series Teenage Mutant Ninja Turtles. He went on to work for Steven Spielberg at his London based Amblimation Studios on the feature classic An American Tail: Fievel Goes West. A year later he worked for the celebrated animator Richard Williams in his roof-top studio in Camden, London on the cult classic animated feature The Thief and the Cobbler which starred Sean Connery, Vincent Price and Kenneth Williams.

Later, Figgis studied business and worked in communications dealer accounts management where he set up his film production company, October Eleven Pictures.

Career

Figgis directed his first feature film when he was asked to collaborate with photographer Simon Marsden on a documentary feature project called The Twilight Hour in 2003. John Hurt joined the project as narrator and the IFTA nominated film was almost immediately acquired by the Discovery Network where it was subsequently distributed to 100 countries in 2004. It was later released on Amazon Prime and DVD through  MVD Entertainment Group. Figgis was then invited by BSkyB to join them as a director in late 2004. He was then assigned a feature project, a film presented by paranormalist Uri Geller under the title Uri's Haunted Cities: Venice. A second project, this time for Sky Arts, followed under the title A Maverick In London. Jason then set up Teen Feature Film Project Ireland and Feature Film Project Ireland, directing three feature projects (Children of a Darker Dawn, The Ecstasy of Isabel Mann and Urban Traffik) with these national initiatives - all of which went on to worldwide distribution through Pop Twist Studios and MVD Entertainment Group. Two multi-award winning / nominated horror films followed - Don't You Recognise Me? and Torment. Jason has also filmed musicians in performance on several occasions. These artistes include Sinead O'Connor, Shane MacGowan and Fun Lovin' Criminals.

Figgis-West

In 2018 Figgis was approached by John West, a journalist and broadcaster, about being interviewed for a magazine on the making of his latest documentary, Simon Marsden: A Life in Pictures. This led to West being invited to promote the documentary and arrange its Nikon sponsored première at the BFI in London. This, in turn, led to the pair forming a film partnership, Figgis-West. Their first joint production was the haunted house feature, The Ghost of Winifred Meeks starring BIFA winner Lara Belmont. This film was distributed by Bayview Entertainment and Pinewood Studios High Fliers Films. Several other feature projects have followed in quick succession with Maverick looking at the history of the celebrated King's Head Theatre in London, the official biographical series of films Colin Wilson: His Life and Work looking at the incredible body of work of the English philosopher and writer, Die Strong looking at the indomitable will of inspirational disability rights activist and influencer Lily Brasch, Love? a docu-drama in collaboration with actress and writer Samantha Beckinsale looking at the domestic violence issue and Shirley Baker: Life Through a Lens, a feature documentary looking at the life and work of the celebrated street photographer. Figgis restored the classic German horror Nosferatu and commissioned a new score from composer Hugh Doolan in 2022 to mark the centenary of the film. Their version of the restoration was selected for the International Vampire Film and Arts Festival and by Element Pictures for distribution through their cinemas Lighthouse and Palas during the centenary year. 

Figgis wrote a foreword for Britain's Haunted Heritage (2019) by John West. He also designed the cover, wrote a foreword and contributed a chapter for West's Britain's Ghostly Heritage which was published in April 2022. Figgis also designed the cover for The Battle of Gainsborough 1643, and the cover of In Search of Roman Lincoln. The latter book he also provided a foreword. Both of these publications are authored by John West.

Filmography

2003. The Twilight Hour: Visions of Ireland's Haunted Past (documentary) - Director/writer.

2005. Uri's Haunted Cities: Venice (documentary) - Director/writer.

2006. A Curious Incident in the Life of Uri Geller - Director/writer.

2007. Blood - Producer/cinematographer.

2008. Dublin: The Movie (segment "Jo Jo") - Director/writer.

2010. Once Upon a Time in Dublin (aka 3Crosses) - Director/writer.

2012. A Christmas Carol - Director/Adaptation.

2013. Children of a Darker Dawn - Director/writer.

2015. The Ecstasy of Isabel Mann - Director/writer.

2016. Urban Traffik - Director/writer.

2016. Don't You Recognise Me? - Director/writer.

2017. Torment - Director.

2017. Grindsploitation (segment "The Wandering") - Director/writer.

2017. The 12 Slays of Christmas (segment “The Uncommon Mr Goode”) - Director/writer.

2017. Grindsploitation 3: Video Nasty (segment "All the Little Things/Vlad the Impaler") - Director/writer.

2017. Grindsploitation 4 (segment “Hacksaw Jack”) - Director/writer.

2017. Trashsploitation (segment “Isabel/Don’t You”) - Director/writer.

2017. Schlocksploitation (segment "Backroads/Bring Me the Head of Anto Murphy”) - Director/writer.

2017. Gore Theatre (segment “Nouveau Monde/Ethan”) - Director/writer.

2017. Home Movies (segment “The Almost Daily Journal of a Madman”) - Director/writer.

2017. Home Movies 2 (segment “Numbers”) - Director/writer.

2017. Horror Box (segment “The Last Train”) - Director/writer.

2017. 1000 Zombies (segment “In The Beginning”) - Director/writer.

2018. Simon Marsden: A Life in Pictures - Director/writer.

2018. Schlock-O-Rama (segment “Railway Children Promo") - Director/writer.

2018. Die In 60 Seconds 3 (segment “Bedside Manner/If You Go Down To The Woods/Run Lady Run”) - Director/writer.

2018. Dark Tales (segment “Friends Forever”) - Director/writer.

2018. American Sasquatch (segment "The Grey Man") - Director/writer.

2018. Grindsploitation 8: Drive-In Grindhouse (segment “Knife”) - Director/writer.

2018. The Haunting of M.R. James - Director.

2019. Gore Theatre 2 (segment “The Black Widow”) - Director/writer.

2019. Theatre of the Deranged III (segment "In Common") - Director/writer.

2019. Clare Island (short) - Director.

2019. Faces Of Fear (segment “The Ties That Bind”) - Director/writer.

2019. Previews of Coming Attractions (film trailer) - Director/writer.

2019. Trailersploitation (film trailer) - Director/writer.

2020. The Wedding Ring (short) - Director/writer.

2020. In Our Day (short) - Director/writer.

2020. Mythmaker: George A. Romero (short) - Director/writer.

2020. Dunkirk 80 (short) - Editor/writer.

2020. Winifred Meeks - Director/writer.

2021. Maverick - Director/writer.

2022. Nosferatu - Co-producer of newly restored/scored version of the 1922 horror classic.

2022. Plague of the Dead (Anthology) - Director/writer.

2022. 60 Seconds to Live (Anthology) - Director/writer.

2022. Cold Sun - Director (pre-production).

2022. Colin Wilson: The Outsider - Director.

2022. Colin Wilson: The Occult -
Director.

2022. Colin Wilson: Access Inner Worlds - Director.

2022. Voyage to a Beginning - Director.

2022. Die Strong - Director. 

2022. My Island (music video for Uri Geller) - Director.

2022. Love? Docudrama on domestic abuse (written and narrated by Samantha Beckinsale) - Director.

References

External links
 
 

Living people
Irish film directors
Year of birth missing (living people)
Place of birth missing (living people)